UFC 236: Holloway vs. Poirier 2  was a mixed martial arts event produced by the Ultimate Fighting Championship held on April 13, 2019 at the State Farm Arena in Atlanta, Georgia.

Background
In the United States, per an extension of its new rights agreements with ESPN through 2025, ESPN+ became the exclusive distributor of UFC pay-per-views for residential customers beginning at UFC 236: viewers must have an active ESPN+ subscription in order to purchase and stream PPV events, and they can no longer be purchased through other outlets (such as television providers). At the same time, the price of the PPV was lowered from $64.99 to $59.99, and a promotional offer was launched allowing new subscribers to purchase a bundle of the PPV and a one-year subscription to ESPN+ for $20 more.

The event was headlined by an interim UFC Lightweight Championship bout between former UFC Featherweight Champion Max Holloway and Dustin Poirier. The two previously met in a featherweight bout at UFC 143 where Poirier won by submission in the first round.

An interim UFC Middleweight Championship bout between The Ultimate Fighter: Team Jones vs. Team Sonnen middleweight winner Kelvin Gastelum and Israel Adesanya served as the co-main event.

A bantamweight bout between Boston Salmon and Khalid Taha was initially scheduled for The Ultimate Fighter: Heavy Hitters Finale. However, the pairing was removed from the card for undisclosed reasons and instead took place at this event.

Paige VanZant was briefly linked to a match-up with Poliana Botelho at the event. However, just days after the pairing was leaked, VanZant announced that she would not be competing on the card due to a fractured right arm. VanZant was replaced by Lauren Mueller.

Results

Bonus awards 
The following fighters were awarded $50,000 bonuses:
 Fight of the Night: Dustin Poirier vs. Max Holloway and Kelvin Gastelum vs. Israel Adesanya
Performance of the Night: No bonus awarded.

Reported payout
The following is the reported payout to the fighters as reported to the Georgia Athletic and Entertainment Commission. It does not include sponsor money and also does not include the UFC's traditional "fight night" bonuses. The total disclosed payroll for the event was $1,972,000.

Dustin Poirier: $250,000 (no win bonus) def. Max Holloway: $350,000
Israel Adesanya: $350,000 (no win bonus) def. Kelvin Gastelum: $150,000
Khalil Rountree Jr.: $70,000 (includes $35,000 win bonus) def. Eryk Anders: $50,000
Dwight Grant: $24,000 (includes $12,000 win bonus) def. Alan Jouban: $43,000
Nikita Krylov: $160,000 (includes $80,000 win bonus) def. Ovince Saint Preux: $86,000
Matt Frevola: $20,000 (includes $10,000 win bonus) def. Jalin Turner: $12,000
Alexandre Pantoja: $36,000 (includes $18,000 win bonus) def. Wilson Reis: $34,000
Max Griffin: $40,000 (includes $20,000 win bonus) def. Zelim Imadaev: $10,000
Khalid Taha: $20,000 (includes $10,000 win bonus) def. Boston Salmon: $10,000
Belal Muhammad: $70,000 (includes $35,000 win bonus) def.  Curtis Millender: $31,000
Montel Jackson: $24,000 (includes $12,000 win bonus) def. Andre Soukhamthath: $22,000
Poliana Botelho: $50,000 (includes $25,000 win bonus) def. Lauren Mueller: $12,000
Brandon Davis: $36,000 (includes $18,000 win bonus) def. Randy Costa: $12,000

See also 

 List of UFC events
 2019 in UFC
 List of current UFC fighters

References 

Ultimate Fighting Championship events
2019 in mixed martial arts
April 2019 sports events in the United States